Jacob "Jaap" Voigt (born 7 June 1941) is a retired field hockey player from the Netherlands. He competed  at 1964 Summer Olympics, where his team finished in seventh place. With three goals in five games, Voigt was the second best Dutch scorer at those games, after Frank Zweerts.

References

External links
 

1941 births
Living people
Dutch male field hockey players
Field hockey players at the 1964 Summer Olympics
Olympic field hockey players of the Netherlands
Field hockey players from Amsterdam
20th-century Dutch people